is a Japanese footballer who plays for Fukushima United FC.

Club statistics
Updated to 23 February 2017.

References

External links
Profile at Fukushima United FC

1990 births
Living people
Kanagawa University alumni
Association football people from Kanagawa Prefecture
Japanese footballers
J1 League players
J3 League players
Japan Football League players
Shonan Bellmare players
Fukushima United FC players
Tochigi City FC players
Association football midfielders